Sandstad is a village in Hitra municipality in Trøndelag county, Norway. The north entrance to the Hitra Tunnel lies just south of the village of Sandstad. In 2018, there were about 229 residents in the village. Sandstad Church is located here.

The village was the administrative centre of the old municipality of Sandstad which existed from 1 July 1914 until its dissolution on 1 January 1964.

References

Hitra
Villages in Trøndelag